John Thornton (16 January 1835 – 15 December 1919) was an Australian cricketer. He played two first-class cricket matches for Victoria between 1858 and 1860.

See also
 List of Victoria first-class cricketers

References

1835 births
1919 deaths
Australian cricketers
Victoria cricketers
Cricketers from Huddersfield
Melbourne Cricket Club cricketers